The Beaver County Transportation Authority (BCTA) is the operator of mass transportation in Beaver County, Pennsylvania. Seven routes are provided, all of which serve the southern and central portions of the county, which are incorporated into suburban Pittsburgh.

Routes 
The agency provides three commuter services to Downtown Pittsburgh and four local routes to benefit area employees and shoppers.
1 Ohio River Boulevard- Chippewa, Big Beaver, Beaver Falls, New Brighton, Rochester, East Rochester, Freedom, Conway, Economy, Baden, Harmony, Ambridge to Downtown Pittsburgh (weekdays, plus Saturday service that does not travel to Pittsburgh)
2 Beaver Valley Mall- Rochester, Monaca, Center, Hopewell, Aliquippa, Ambridge (Mon-Sat)
3 Rochester Express- Rochester, Economy to Downtown Pittsburgh (weekday rush hour)
4 Chippewa Express- Chippewa, Center to Downtown Pittsburgh (weekday rush hour)
11 Beaver/Vanport- Monaca, Vanport, Brighton, Beaver, Rochester (Mon-Sat)

Fixed Route Fleet 
11 MCI D4500 Diesel coaches
6 MCI D4500 CNG Buses
3 40-Foot Gillig CNG Buses
4 35-Foot Gillig Diesel Buses

Park & Ride Lots 
Ambridge- 160 spaces (Routes 1 , 2, & 3; plus Port Authority Route 14)
Chippewa Central Square- 240 spaces (Routes 1 & 4)
Expressway Travel Center (Center Township)- 201 spaces (Routes 2 & 4)
Northern Lights Shopping Center (Economy)- 100 spaces (Routes 1 & 3)
Rochester Transit Center- 73 spaces (Routes 1, 2, 3, & 11)

References

External links 
http://www.bcta.com/

Bus transportation in Pennsylvania
Municipal authorities in Pennsylvania
Transportation in Beaver County, Pennsylvania
Government of Beaver County, Pennsylvania
Transportation in Pittsburgh